Akhtar Shah (born 1 January 2002) is a Pakistani cricketer. He made his Twenty20 debut on 15 October 2020, for Balochistan in the 2020–21 National T20 Cup. He made his first-class debut on 25 October 2020, also for Balochistan, in the 2020–21 Quaid-e-Azam Trophy.

References

External links
 

2002 births
Living people
Pakistani cricketers
Balochistan cricketers
Place of birth missing (living people)